IMS MAXIMS is a supplier of electronic health record software to the public and private sectors in UK and the Republic of Ireland.

As of December 2016, its products were in use across 180 healthcare organisations, by 30,000 users each day for 13 million patients.

It has offices in Milton Keynes,  Dún Laoghaire and Romania.

In 2015 the company released an open source version of its software – openMAXIMS - which acute trusts can use without a licence fee and alter the code to tailor the system to their needs. Its open technology has increased collaboration in the development of the software which has resulted in better clinical engagement. The company is seen as a pioneer in the use of open-source software in the NHS.

The company has established a community interest company (CIC) to support the development of the open-source software it has developed. Customers Taunton and Somerset NHS Foundation Trust, Blackpool Teaching Hospitals NHS Foundation Trust, St Helens and Knowsley Teaching Hospitals NHS Trust, and private healthcare group, Ramsay Healthcare UK are members of the CIC.

In 2016, Taunton and Somerset NHS Foundation Trust, the first hospital in the UK to deploy openMAXIMS electronic health record, was named by Health Secretary Jeremy Hunt as a Global Digital Exemplar. The software will save the trust £600,000 a year by 2018.

Ramsay Health Care UK installed the MAXIMS electronic patient record in all its 35 hospital sites in 2022, the first private healthcare provider in the UK to implement a system of this scale.  It is to be installed in Jersey General Hospital in 2023.

The company is a founding member of INTEROPen, an organisation that aims to accelerate, promote, and encourage the use of open source solutions within health & social care; and is part of Code4Health, an initiative supporting the best practice of digital technology in the NHS.

IMS MAXIMS services are available to purchase on the UK Government's Crown Commercial Service G Cloud 8 Framework, NHS Shared Business Services Framework and Digital Outcomes and Specialists Framework.

The company has been shortlisted for two awards - Health Investor IT Innovator of the Year 2016 and Biomnis Healthcare Innovation 2013 - and was highly commended for eHealth Insider's Healthcare IT Product Innovation Award 2015.

References

External links
 Company website

Electronic health record software companies
Private providers of NHS services